Lukas Ettlin (born 1975 in Switzerland)  is a director and cinematographer who is known for films and television shows such as The Lincoln Lawyer, Battle: Los Angeles, Black Sails, Counterpart and Daredevil. He is a graduate of the New York University Film School. He is the winner of the 2001 ASC Heritage Award from the American Society of Cinematographers at the beginning of his career.

Credentials
Since 2013 Ettlin has worked primarily as a television director, with credits including:

Barkskins
Tom Clancy's Jack Ryan
See
Counterpart
Black Sails
Power
Daredevil
The Last Ship
Shooter
Taken
The Arrangement
Krypton
Aquarius

Filmography as a Cinematographer

Films

TV series

References

External links
 

Living people
1975 births
Swiss directors
Swiss cinematographers
Place of birth missing (living people)
Tisch School of the Arts alumni